Craig Hall (born 10 May 1974) is a New Zealand actor.

Personal life 
Hall was born in Auckland, New Zealand. He lives in Auckland and Sydney and is married to his A Place to Call Home co-star Sara Wiseman.

Filmography

Film

Television

References

External links 

1974 births
Living people
New Zealand male film actors
New Zealand male television actors